Kadhal Sadugudu is a 2003 Indian Tamil-language romantic drama film written and directed by Durai and produced by S. S. Chakravarthy. The film stars Vikram, Priyanka Trivedi, Prakash Raj, and Vivek. The music was composed by Deva with editing by Suresh Urs.

Plot
The film starts off by showing Chithambaram (Prakash Raj) and how he is an important man in the village. He is an adamant and always sticks on to his decisions. When the temple festival starts, Chithambaram's daughter Kausalya (Priyanka Trivedi) goes to her grandfather's (M. N. Nambiar) house to celebrate. There, she meets Suresh (Vikram), and they fall in love. Chithambaram gets into many conflicts with Suresh, not even knowing who he is. All the things that Suresh does were unintentional, but Chithambaram does not realize this. Therefore, Chithambaram ends up with a very negative opinion of Suresh. One day, everyone in Kausalya's grandfather's home finds out that Suresh and Kausalya are in love, unbeknownst to Chithambaram. On seeing this, they try to get Chithambaram to agree to the wedding. Chithambaram, however, stubbornly sticks to his decision that the marriage should not take place.

Suresh asks Chithambaram what would make him happy, and Chithambaram says that he would be happy if Suresh dies. Realizing that arguing further would be futile, Suresh decides to go back to Madras. Meanwhile, Ilavarasu gets attracted towards Kausalya's physique and begins molesting her. She somehow manages to escape and reports it to her father, but she feels that she is insecure and needs a companion. Kausalya tries to join Suresh at the railway station to go with him, but Suresh refuses, saying that if he marries her, it will be with her father's permission. At that time, Chithambaram arrived at the station to prevent his daughter from eloping with Suresh. He hears this conversation and finally decides to accept Suresh as his daughter's love, and Suresh agrees.

Cast

 Vikram as Suresh
 Priyanka Trivedi as Kausalya
 Prakash Raj as Chithambaram
 Vivek as 'Super' Subbu
 Rekha as Kausalya's mother
 Vaishnavi as Suresh's friend
 M. N. Nambiar as Kausalya's grandfather
 Paravai Muniyamma as Subbu's grandmother
 Alphonsa as Carolina
 Nandhakumar as Saathappan, Subbu's father
 Ilavarasu
 Delhi Ganesh
 Theni Kunjarammal
 C. R. Vijayakumari
 Nalini 
 Kovai Babu as Minor Kunjumani
 Bava Lakshmanan
 Vijay Ganesh
 Rani (special appearance in "Sugandhi Sellai")

Production
The film was developed under the title of Adhisayam, with director V. Z. Durai revealing he insisted on Vikram being cast in the lead role. Meena was initially considered for the lead role, before the producers confirmed Priyanka Trivedi, for whom the project was also meant to mark her Tamil film debut. However, delays meant that two other films released beforehand. The film began schedules in early 2001 and Vikram put on weight for the role, after going on a diet for his portrayal of a police officer in Dhill (2001).

Release
The film opened to mixed reviews, with Malathi Rangarajan of The Hindu noting that the film is neither "action packed nor a haunting family drama", adding that time you wish it "were a little more brisk and dynamic". A further reviewer with BizHat.com wrote that the film was a "disappointment" and left "no impact" on viewers. Post-release, the film's comedy track by actor Vivek has garnered appreciation from film critics.

The film performed poorly at the box office, coming after several successful films for Vikram during the period. Vikram later claimed that he was taken for a "royal ride" and that the story went through several changes after the initial narration. He also alleged that the producer S. S. Chakravarthy was increasingly loyal to another actor, Ajith Kumar, and was not interested in portraying Vikram in good light. The film was later dubbed into Hindi and released in 2014 under the title Aparichit 2, though it had no connection with the first part of Aparichit (2005).

Soundtrack
Music for the soundtrack was scored by Deva. Lyrics written by Vairamuthu.

References

External links 
 

2003 films
2003 romantic comedy-drama films
Films scored by Deva (composer)
2000s Tamil-language films
Indian family films
Indian romantic comedy-drama films
Films directed by V. Z. Durai
2003 comedy films